Gillette Ridge Golf Club is a public golf course located in Bloomfield, Connecticut. Located on the Cigna headquarters campus (formerly known as Connecticut General Life Insurance), it is the only public Arnold Palmer designed course in the Northeast. Cigna Insurance currently owns the property and has Arnold Palmer Golf Management running the daily operations.

The club is named after Francis Gillette.

History 
On September 27, 1999, Cigna announced plans to develop land at its Bloomfield headquarters. This included a golf course, conference center, hotel, office buildings, and homes. The project was named Gilette Ridge in December 2001. The course opened to the public on July 30, 2004.

Course 
The course is noted for its difficulty, with a relatively large number of hazards.

References

External links

Golf clubs and courses in Connecticut
Arnold Palmer
Buildings and structures in Hartford County, Connecticut
2004 establishments in Connecticut
Sports venues in Hartford County, Connecticut